Bojan Brać (Serbian Cyrillic: Бојан Браћ; born 28 February 1989) is a Serbian professional footballer who played as a goalkeeper for FK Kabel Novi Sad.

Honours
Universitatea Craiova
 Liga II: 2013–14

External links
 
 

Association football goalkeepers
CS Universitatea Craiova players
Expatriate footballers in Romania
Expatriate footballers in Slovakia
FK Dukla Banská Bystrica players
FK Hajduk Kula players
FK Radnički Sombor players
FK Radnički Niš players
Liga I players
Liga II players
Serbian expatriate footballers
Serbian expatriate sportspeople in Romania
Serbian expatriate sportspeople in Slovakia
Serbian footballers
Serbian SuperLiga players
1989 births
Living people
FK Kabel players